KAIA is a five-member Filipino girl group under ShowBT Philippines. The group consists of Charice, Angela, Alexa, Sophia, and Charlotte. Their pre-debut single "Kaya" was released on December 10, 2021. The group officially debuted on April 8, 2022, with debut single "Blah Blah".

KAIA Members

Discography

Filmography

Television shows

Online shows

Concerts

Awards and nominations

References

External links 
 

Filipino girl groups
Filipino pop music groups
Musical groups from Metro Manila
ShowBT Entertainment artists
Sony Music Philippines artists
Musical groups established in 2021
2021 establishments in the Philippines
English-language singers from the Philippines
Musical quintets
Vocal quintets